Herman Peter Warmack (October 7, 1882 – August 6, 1963) was an American Negro league first baseman and manager.

A native of Maywood, Indiana, Warmack attended Tuskegee Institute. He played for the St. Louis Giants in 1911 and managed the French Lick Plutos in 1912. Warmack died in Indianapolis, Indiana in 1963 at age 80.

References

External links
Baseball statistics and player information from Baseball-Reference Black Baseball Stats and Seamheads

1882 births
1963 deaths
St. Louis Giants players
Baseball first basemen
Baseball players from Indiana
People from Marion County, Indiana
20th-century African-American people